The Glamorgan barracks bombing was the bombing of a British Army military barracks in Duisburg, West Germany, carried out by the Provisional Irish Republican Army (IRA). The attack injured nine soldiers. The Glamorgan barracks housed soldiers from the Royal Corps of Transport. Seventy soldiers were sleeping at the time of the explosion. The two  bombs blew a hole in the barracks and tore the roof. Nine British soldiers received minor wounds. It was the first IRA attack on the European mainland since the Netherlands attacks in May. The two bombs were placed some eight yards inside the barracks compound, against the wall of the quarters were some 70 soldiers were sleeping. None of the nine injured soldiers needed hospital treatment, although an army sergeant spokesman said they were very lucky nobody was killed. Moments after the blast police saw the IRA getaway car run a red lightand gave chase, but the IRA unit fired shots at the police car and the police gave up the chase, letting the IRA volunteers escape.

A month after the Glamorgan barracks bombing, the IRA bombed Roy barracks in Düsseldorf, West Germany. The blast tore part of the roof and wounded three British soldiers and a civilian.

See also
1988 IRA attacks in the Netherlands
Operation Flavius
1987 Rheindahlen bombing
Provisional Irish Republican Army campaign 1969–1997

References

1988 in West Germany
Building bombings in Germany
Improvised explosive device bombings in 1988
July 1988 events in Europe
Military actions and engagements during the Troubles (Northern Ireland)
Provisional IRA bombings in continental Europe
Terrorist incidents in Germany in 1988